The fourth season of the animated television series, Archer originally aired in the United States on the cable network FX. This season started on January 17, 2013, with "Fugue and Riffs" and ended with the two part episode "Sea Tunt" on April 4, 2013, and April 11, 2013, respectively with a total of thirteen episodes.

Production
On February 23, 2012, the Atlanta Journal-Constitution reported that FX had ordered a 13-episode 4th season of Archer, and signed a multi-year deal with Adam Reed and Matt Thompson's Floyd County Productions. Aisha Tyler also confirmed Archer was returning for a fourth season early in 2013 while appearing as a guest on Rove LA. The first episode premiered on January 17, 2013.

Episodes

Home media

References

External links 

 
 

2013 American television seasons
Archer (2009 TV series) seasons